Dieffenbach is a German surname. Notable people with the surname include:

 Edouard Dieffenbach (1897-1972) French military officer, World War I veteran
 Ernst Dieffenbach (1811–55), German physician, geologist and naturalist
 Georg Christian Dieffenbach (1822-1901), German poet and theologian
 Johann Friedrich Dieffenbach (1792–1847), German surgeon
 Joseph Dieffenbach (1796–1863), German gardener

See also
Diefenbach (surname)

German-language surnames